Jordan and Saudi Arabia are both Sunni monarchies. Historically, the Hashemite dynasty came to Jordan from the Hijaz, which is now part of Saudi Arabia. The Hashemites ruled Mecca from the 10th century until 1924, when the House of Saud annexed the area in the Saudi conquest of Hejaz.

The two cities of Aqaba and Ma'an were part of the Kingdom of Hejaz (1916–1925). In May 1925, Ibn Saud gave up the Aqaba and Ma’an districts of the Hejaz and it became part of British Emirate of Transjordan. In 1965, Saudi Arabia and Jordan agreed to trade land, thus finalising the Jordan–Saudi Arabia border. Jordan gained 19 kilometers of land on the Gulf of Aqaba and 6,000 square kilometers of territory in the interior, and 7,000 square kilometers of Jordanian-administered, landlocked territory was ceded to Saudi Arabia.

According to a 2013 Pew global opinion poll, 88% of Jordanians express a favourable view of Saudi Arabia, with 11% expressing an unfavourable view, the most favourable opinion of the KSA in the Middle East.

After the elevation of Mohammed bin Salman to Saudi Crown Prince, relations have deteriorated over Saudi attempts to sideline Jordan in negotiations over the Israeli–Palestinian conflict, Jordan's reluctant support of Saudi Arabia during the 2017–18 Qatar diplomatic crisis and limited involvement in the Saudi-led intervention in Yemen, and growing Jordanian ties with Turkey.

Saudi Arabia concluded an agreement with Jordan to provide assistance and support to the educational sector for $50 million.

On 22 June 2022, Abdullah II of Jordan met with Saudi Arabian Crown Prince Mohammed bin Salman. They discussed bilateral relations, investment plans and Joe Biden’s Middle East visit in July.

References 

 
Saudi Arabia
Bilateral relations of Saudi Arabia